Sean Fraser may refer to:

Sean Fraser (politician) (born 1984), Canadian politician from Nova Scotia
Sean Fraser (Canadian footballer) (born 1980), former Canadian association football player
Sean Fraser (Jamaican footballer) (born 1983), Jamaican association football player
Sean Fraser (swimmer), Scottish swimmer
Shaune Fraser (born 1988), a Cayman Islands swimmer